Le Bossu (The Hunchback) is a French historical adventure novel by Paul Féval, first published in serial parts in Paris in 1858.

Loosely based on real events, the story is set in France in two distinct periods, 1699 and 1717, and incorporates real historical characters such as Philippe II, Duke of Orléans.

Plot summary

Si tu ne viens pas à Lagardère, Lagardère ira à toi! ("If you don't come to Lagardère, Lagardère will come to you!")

Such is the oath given by the adventurer Lagardère to the wicked Prince de Gonzague, who has plotted to murder the daughter and seize the fortune of the dashing Duc de Nevers.  In the first volume, Le Petit Parisien, the Prince de Gonzague murders the Duc de Nevers.  Henri Lagardère rescues Nevers' daughter Aurore and raises her in exile, where she makes friends with a gypsy girl named Flor.  The second volume, Le Chevalier de Lagardère, describes Lagardère's triumph over the Prince de Gonzague.

Influence
The novel is one of a number of works such as The Three Musketeers (1844) which helped define the genre of "swashbuckler" novel, known in French as a "roman de cape et d'épée".

Lagardère's promise of revenge – "Si tu ne viens pas à Lagardère, Lagardère ira à toi!" –  became a proverbial phrase in the French language.

Paul Féval's son, Paul Féval, fils, borrowed his father's hero for his own series of "Lagardère" novels.

Adaptations
The book has formed the basis for a large number of film versions, including Le Bossu (released as On Guard in English-speaking countries), directed by Philippe de Broca in 1997, with Daniel Auteuil (Lagardère), Marie Gillain (Aurore de Nevers), and Fabrice Luchini (Gonzague).

External links
 Jolas, Claudine. Le Bossu, de Paul Féval: Étude d'un roman populaire.
 Le Bossu, audio version 

1858 French novels
French adventure novels
French historical novels
Novels set in Paris
Novels set in the 1690s
Novels set in the 1710s
Fiction set in 1699
Fiction set in 1717
Novels first published in serial form
Works originally published in Le Siècle
French novels adapted into films